Ítróttarfelag Fuglafjarðar, abbreviated to ÍF, is a Faroese football club based in Fuglafjørður. They play their home games at Í Fløtugerði. The 1979 Faroe Islands Premier League title is ÍF's sole to date. They also won the 1. deild (2nd tier) 4 times.

Achievements
Faroe Islands Premier League: 1
1979
1. deild: 4
1984, 1987, 2003, 2018
ÍF has never won the cup title. The team has lost 6 finals: in 1975 to HB Tórshavn by 7–4 in a two-legged final; in 1982 once again to HB by 2–1; in 1987, ÍF lost its third final to HB in a row after the replay, which HB won by 3–0; in 2005 to GÍ Gøta by 4–1; and most recently, in 2010 and 2011 to EB/Streymur by 1–0 & 3–0, respectively.

European record

Current squad
As of 1 May 2021.

Managers

 Páll Guðlaugsson (1989–1991)
 Meinhard Dalbúð (1993–1994)
 Sonni Jensen (1995)
 Petur Simonsen (1996–1997)
 Piotr Krakowski (1998–1999)
 Pauli Jarnskor (2001–2002)
 Bogi Lervig (2002)
 Petur Mohr (2002–2003)
 Sigfríður Clementsen (2003–2004)
 Petur Mohr (2004–2005)
 Petur Simonsen (2005–2006)
 Jón Simonsen (2006–2007)
 Abraham Løkin (2008)
 Roy Róin (2008)
 David Jones (2008)
 Albert Ellefsen (2008)
 Jón Simonsen (2009)
 Jón Simonsen &  Abraham Løkin (2009–2010)
 Abraham Løkin (2010–2011)
 Símun Eliasen &  Rúni Nolsøe (2011)
 Flemming Christensen (2012)
 Albert Ellefsen (2013–2015)
 Jákup Mikkelsen (2015)
 Jógvan Martin Olsen (2016)
 Jákup Mikkelsen &  Símun Eliasen (2016)
 Jákup Mikkelsen (2017)
 Oddbjørn Joensen &  Albert Ellefsen (2017)
 Hegga Samuelsen (2018–2019)
 Ólavur Larsen (2019)
 Kári Reynheim &  Hans Jørgen Djurhuus (2019)
 Hans Jørgen Djurhuus &  Ólavur Larsen (2019)

External links
Official website (in Faroese)

Sport in Fuglafjørður
Association football clubs established in 1946
1946 establishments in the Faroe Islands
ÍF Fuglafjørður